Poulett-Harris is a double-barrelled surname, composed of Poulett and Harris. Notable people with the name include:

 Lily Poulett-Harris (1873–1897), Australian sportswoman and educationalist
 Richard Deodatus Poulett-Harris (1817–1899), educationalist in England and Tasmania

Compound surnames